Pickering Town Football Club were first established in 1888 and for many years the club competed in local football leagues. Pickering eventually joining the Yorkshire Football League Division Three in 1972. When the Football League introduced the step system for non-league teams, the club were in the Northern Counties East Football League Division 1 at Step 6 of the non-league system (Level 10 overall).

Key

Key to league record
 Lvl = Level of the league in the current league system
 S = Numbers of seasons
 Pld = Games played
 W = Games won
 D = Games drawn
 L = Games lost
 GF = Goals for
 GA = Goals against
 GD = Goals difference
 Pts = Points
 Position = Position in the final league table
 Overall position = Overall club position in the English league system

Key to cup records
 Res = Final reached round
 Rec = Final club record in the form of wins-draws-losses
 EP= Extra Preliminary round
 PR = Premilinary round
 QR1 = Qualifying round 1
 QR2 = Qualifying round 2
 QR3 = Qualifying round 3
 QR4 = Qualifying round 4
 R1 = Round 1
 R2 = Round 2
 R3 = Round 3
 R4 = Round 4
 R5 = Round 5
 R6 = Round 6
 QF = Quarter-finals
 SF = Semi-finals
 RU = Runners-up
 W = Winners

Seasons
In the non-league system where there is promotion and relegation there is the necessity for those in charge of scheduling matches to move some teams between different regional leagues at the same level to ensure as even a geographical spread as possible.

Timeline notes
Of the available records, it shows the club joining the York League in the 1953–54 season. From those records, only the final positions have been recorded. Despite joining the Yorkshire League in the 1972–73 season, records show the club continued to compete in the York League until the end of the 1976–77 season
The 1984–85 season saw the introduction of 3 points for a win.
The club's FA Vase 1st round 2nd replay win was played at a neutral venue in Ryhope, Sunderland.
The club lost their 2007–08 FA Vase 3 round tie against Winterton Rangers, but progressed when their opponents were thrown out for fielding an ineligible player.
The club's 2009–10 FA Vase 3 round replay against Dunkirk was a 2–2 draw in regulation play. The club won the tie 5–4 on penalties.
The club's 2011–12 FA Cup Preliminary Round replay against Liversedge was drawn 3–3 in regulation play. The club won the tie 5–4 on penalties.
The club's 2016–17 FA Cup Extra Preliminary round replay Sunderland Ryhope Colliery Welfare was drawn 3–3 in regulation play. The club won the tie 3–1 on penalties.
The club's 2018–19 FA Cup Preliminary round tie against Clitheroe was a home tie, but was actually played at Selby Town F.C.
The club's 2018–19 FA Cup Preliminary round tie against Colne was a home tie, but was actually played at Scarborough Athletic F.C.
The 2019–20 and 2020–21 seasons were abandoned due to the effects of the COVID-19 pandemic.

References

Pickering